Stadionul Municipal is a multi-use stadium in Miercurea Ciuc, Romania. It is used mostly for football matches and is the home ground of FK Miercurea Ciuc. The stadium holds 4,000 people.

References

Football venues in Romania
Buildings and structures in Harghita County
Miercurea Ciuc